Rodney Leonard (Rod) Jory AM, (26 November 1938 – 14 October 2021), was an Australian physicist noted for establishing and running the National Youth Science Forum (NYSF/NSSS) and for his contributions to Australian teams which have competed at the International Physics Olympiad. He retired from the position of director of the NYSF in January 2005, and currently resides in Canberra, Australia.

Education
Born and bred in Adelaide, after beginning his high schooling at Woodville High School (1951), Professor Jory then attended Prince Alfred College (1952–1955). His university education began at the University of Adelaide with a Bachelor of Science degree with honours (1956–1960). This was followed with a PhD from The Australian National University (1960–1964).

His PhD was completed under the guidance of Professor L. G. H. Huxley and Dr R. W. Crompton, initially at the University of Adelaide and then transferring to the Australian National University. The research focussed on the drift velocities and diffusion coefficients of electrons in nitrogen, hydrogen and helium.

University career
Professor Jory has taught at a number of Australian and overseas universities, most extensively at The Australian National University and the University of Canberra.
His career history is as follows:
 1964, technical assistant, Research School of Physical Sciences, Australian National University
 1965, senior demonstrator, Department of Physics, Australian National University
 1965–1966, research associate, Florida State University
 1967–1968, lecturer, University of Liverpool
 1969, lecturer, University of New England
 1970–1973, senior lecturer, Canberra College of Advanced Education
 1974–1984, registrar, Canberra College of Advanced Education
 1985–1989, principal lecturer, Canberra College of Advanced Education
 1989–?, visiting fellow, Australian National University
 1990–?, associate professor, University of Canberra
 2006, visiting lecturer, University of Sussex
 2007, visiting lecturer, University of Vienna
 2008, professor University of British Columbia

NSSS / NYSF
In Australia, Professor Jory is well known for his involvement with the National Science Summer School (which was renamed the National Youth Science Forum in 1996). He assumed the role of director at its inception, and stayed in that position for 21 years (1984–2005).

Major awards
 1990, Rotary District 9710 Vocational Excellence Medal for work as Director of the NSSS since 1984.
 1992, Rotary International Certificate of Appreciation and Commendation for exemplary service to the Programs of Rotary.
 1997, Member of the Order of Australia (AM).
 1997, Australian Institute of Physics Award for Outstanding Service to Physics in Australia
 1999, finalist in The Michael Daley Eureka Prize for the Promotion of Science, awarded by the Australian Museum.

Miscellaneous
 Fellow of the Australian Institute of Physics
 ACT Justice of the Peace
 Flying Officer, (RAAF), retired
 Executive member, Australian Soccer Federation, various years, 1960–1979

Scientific publications

Press articles
 The Australian National University media release 28 January 1997
 Rotary Down Under issue No 447 December 2003 January 2004

See also
 National Youth Science Forum
 International Physics Olympiad

References
 Member of the Order of Australia, awarded Australia Day, 1997.
 The Michael Daley Eureka Prize for the Promotion of Science, 1999 finalist.

External links 
 Rod's homepage, 

1938 births
2021 deaths
Scientists from Adelaide
Australian physicists
People educated at Prince Alfred College
University of Adelaide alumni
Australian National University alumni
Academic staff of the Australian National University
Members of the Order of Australia
Florida State University faculty
Fellows of the Australian Institute of Physics